Djebel Chélia is a mountain in Algeria. It is the highest point in the Aurès Mountains which straddle the border between Algeria and Tunisia, and it is the second highest peak in Algeria after Mount Tahat. Djebel Chélia is situated in the west of Khenchela, in Bouhmama county. Abiod Valley begins at the foot of Djebel Chélia.

See also
List of mountains in Algeria
 List of Ultras of Africa

References

External links
 "Djebel Chélia, Algeria" on Peakbagger

Chelia